

List

See also
2008 in Romania
List of 2008 box office number-one films in Romania

Lists of 2008 films by country or language
2009
2008 in Romanian cinema